USS De Soto County (LST-1171) was a  built for the United States Navy during the late 1950s. The lead ship of her class of seven, she was named after counties in Florida, Louisiana, and Mississippi, the only U.S. Naval vessel to bear the name.

De Soto County was designed under project SCB 119 and laid down 15 September 1956 at Avondale, Louisiana by  Avondale Marine Ways, Inc.; launched on 28 February 1957; sponsored by Mrs. C. Horton Smith; and commissioned on 10 June 1958.

Service history
For almost the entire length of her active service, De Soto County was assigned to the Amphibious Force, Atlantic Fleet. She interspersed operations off the east coast of the United States with frequent deployments to the Caribbean and the Mediterranean. The tank landing ship saw brief service in the Vietnam theater of operations in 1969.

Grado (L 9890)
Decommissioned on 17 July 1972, De Soto County was transferred to the Italian Navy where she served as Grado (L 9890). Struck from the Naval Vessel Register 8 May 1992, the ship was sold for scrapping by the Italian government in 1989.

De Soto County earned one Meritorious Unit Commendation for service with the 6th Fleet in the Mediterranean and one battle star for Vietnam War service.

See also

 DeSoto County, Florida
 De Soto Parish, Louisiana
 DeSoto County, Mississippi
  (DeSoto County-class based design for the Argentine Navy)

References
 
 

 

De Soto County-class tank landing ships
De Soto County-class tank landing ships of the Italian Navy
Cold War amphibious warfare vessels of the United States
Ships built in Bridge City, Louisiana
1957 ships